Wurmbea pygmaea is a species of plant in the Colchicaceae family that is endemic to Australia.

Description
The species is a cormous perennial herb that grows to a height of 1–5 cm. Its white or pink flowers appear from May to July.

Distribution and habitat
The species is found in the Avon Wheatbelt, Geraldton Sandplains, Jarrah Forest and Swan Coastal Plain IBRA bioregions of south-western Western Australia. It grows in red or brown sand, clay and gravelly soils, which are often seasonally wet, as well as on granite outcrops.

References

pygmaea
Monocots of Australia
Flora of Western Australia
Plants described in 1846
Taxa named by Stephan Endlicher
Taxa named by George Bentham